Nether Edge and Sharrow Ward , which includes the districts of Brincliffe, Nether Edge, Sharrow, and part of Highfield, is one of the 28 electoral wards in the City of Sheffield, England. In 2011, the population of this ward was 18,890 people in 7,592 households. Nether Edge ward is one of the wards that make up the Sheffield Central parliamentary constituency.

History 
Before the 19th century, the area that is now Nether Edge was largely rural, the only clusters of cottages being the small medieval hamlet of Cherry Tree Hill and a small hamlet at Machon Bank. Much of the development of the area was undertaken by George Wostenholm, a local cutler who from 1836 onward purchased a large area of land east of Brincliffe Edge.

Wostenholm's home, Kenwood House, and the surrounding park (now the Kenwood Hall Hotel) took up a large portion of the land, the garden designer, Robert Marnock laid out the surrounding roads as a series of curving avenues and the remaining land sold off for development. As a result, many of the homes in the area are spacious Victorian houses that were owned by local cutlers and businessmen.

The Poor Law Amendment Act 1834 (PLAA) allowed parishes to form unions, jointly responsible for the administration and funding of Poor Law in their area. By 1831 the population of the area had increased considerably and in 1837 the ‘Ecclesall Bierlow Poor Law Union’ (PLD or Poor Law District) was founded and Ecclesall Bierlow Union Workhouse, Cherry Tree Hill, Nether Edge was built. In 1929 the workhouse was renamed Nether Edge Hospital housing a Gynaecology Unit established to serve the whole of Sheffield.

Districts of Nether Edge ward

Nether Edge
Nether Edge is an established residential suburb in the southwest of the City of Sheffield, England.

Local facilities include a small shopping area at the junction of Nether Edge Road and Machon Bank Road, featuring a cafe, arts & crafts shops, a dentist, organic fruit & vegetable shop, "Zed on the Edge", a local baker, delicatessen / cafes, including "Cafe #9", barber and hairdresser shops, a local mini-market, Bannerdale Osteopaths and a Sainsburys Local supermarket and a separate garage situated on the site of a former tram terminus. Two small theatres (the Merlin and the Lantern) also exist in the area. A farmers market selling local food produce and craft goods is held four times a year in the central area on dates roughly coinciding with the equinoxes and solstice dates.

Banner Cross
Banner Cross is a district of Sheffield centred on the intersection of Ecclesall Road and Psalter Lane. This district is split evenly between Nether Edge and Ecclesall Wards. Banner Cross Hall, an ancient esquire seat, was virtually rebuilt in 1820. The main place of worship is Banner Cross Methodist Church. The nearby Banner Cross pub gained infamy when the notorious criminal Charles Peace shot and killed Arthur Dyson in the passageway beside the pub on 29 November 1876. The base of an old stone cross still remained at Banner Cross in 1819. Addy (1888) suggested that the name derives from bæna kross, meaning the cross of prayers.

Brincliffe

Sharrow
Sharrow is a suburb of Sheffield located directly southwest of Sheffield city centre. Sharrow's back to back terraced housing in Little Sheffield was redeveloped in the 1970s to provide modern, high density accommodation for the area's working class population. During the 1980s, cultural, economic and social tensions contributed to a general decline of the district. With the economic resurgence of Sheffield in the late 1990s, Sharrow has benefited from considerable inward investment both in improved housing stock and through development of local initiatives such as the small business enterprise unit at Sheffield United F.C.'s Bramall Lane ground in nearby Highfield.

References

External links 
 Nether Edge Neighbourhood Group
 History of Nether Edge Hospital
 King's Centre Church, Union Rd, Nether Edge
 Sources for the history of Nether Edge Produced by Sheffield City Council's Libraries and Archives

Wards of Sheffield